The men's 4 miles team race was a track and field athletics event held as part of the Athletics at the 1904 Summer Olympics programme. It was the first time the event was held, though the 1900 Summer Olympics had featured a similar event in the 5000 metre team race. Two teams of five athletes each competed. The competition was held on September 3, 1904. The event was won by the New York AC team, with Arthur L. Newton finishing first individually; Chicago AA had the next three finishers (starting with Jim Lightbody in second), but Chicago also had the last two runners. New York won by 1 point.

Background

A team race event had been introduced to the Olympics in 1900, with a 5000 metres version. The 1904 Games were the only one at which the distance was 4 miles. A 3 miles team race would be held in 1908 before the distance was standardized to 3000 metres for 1912, 1920, and 1924. Team races were removed from the programme after that.

This was the last event on the athletics programme, with New York AC and Chicago AA tied for the lead in team victories up to this point.

Competition format

The race distance was 4 miles. Only a final was held. All of the runners began in a mass start. The team score was based on a point-for-place system, with the first runner scoring 1 point, second 2 points, and so forth. The team with the lowest score, adding all five team members' scores, was the winner.

The track was a cinder track 1/3 mile in length with one long straightaway.

Schedule

Results

Individual standings

The points system was based on point-for-place, with low scores desirable.

Team standings

The scores from each of the individual team members were summed, with the lowest-scoring team winning.

Notes

References
 

Athletics at the 1904 Summer Olympics
1904